Shane Crawford (born 16 November 1979 in Falmouth, Jamaica) is a Jamaican professional football player who plays as a defender.

In 2000, Crawford began his professional career with Village United F.C. in Jamaica.  In 2005, he signed with the Harrisburg City Islanders of the USL Second Division.  In 2006, he spent the season with the Charleston Battery in the USL First Division. In the fall of 2006, he returned to Jamaica where he rejoined Village United.

References

External links
 
 

1979 births
Living people
Association football defenders
Charleston Battery players
Penn FC players
Expatriate soccer players in the United States
Jamaican footballers
Jamaican expatriate footballers
Jamaica international footballers
People from Trelawny Parish
USL First Division players
USL Second Division players
Village United F.C. players